Yemen has competed at the IAAF World Athletics Championships on fourteen occasions, and did not send a delegation for the 1991 and 2017 editions. Its competing country code is YEM. The IAAF treats the past participation of the Yemen Arab Republic (YAR) and South Yemen (PRY) as part of a united Yemen's history. The country has not won any medals at the competition and as of 2017 no Yemeni athlete has progressed beyond the first round of an event.

References 

IAAF World Athletics Championships Doha 2019 - Statistics Handbook. IAAF (2019). Retrieved 2019-09-26.

 
Yemen
World Championships in Athletics